Whakaata Māori is a New Zealand television channel that broadcasts programmes that make a significant contribution to the revitalisation of the Māori language and culture. Funded by the New Zealand Government, it commenced broadcasting as Māori Television on 28 March 2004 from its studios in Newmarket, Auckland. It has since moved to East Tamaki, Auckland.

History

Māori Television was launched on 28 March 2004 and attracted 300,000 viewers in its second month of operation. The main channel attracts 1.5 million viewers each month, including half of all Māori aged five or more, and one-third of all New Zealanders. Te Reo, a second channel from Māori Television, was launched on 28 March 2008.  In contrast with the main channel, it is ad-free and completely in the Māori language (without subtitles). Te Reo features special tribal programming with a particular focus on new programming for the fluent members of its audience.

On 23 May 2022, the channel announced that it was going to change its official name to Whakaata Māori, the name being used in the Māori since the channel's inception, but until then not at an official scale. The new name took effect on June 9 with a special dawn ceremony.

Operations
The channel operates under the stewardship of the New Zealand government, and the Māori Television Electoral College (Te Putahi Paoho). As of 2021 it had a budget of NZ$19.24 million.

In July 2015, Māori Television's seven-member board of directors decided that Hamilton or Rotorua could be a new home for the broadcaster.

Ratings
A survey in 2009 by Business and Economic Research Limited found that 84% of the general New Zealand population think Māori Television should be a permanent part of New Zealand broadcasting.

Whakaata Māori continues to attract an increasingly broad audience across ages, genders and ethnicities. More than two-thirds of its audience are non-Māori. They are drawn by the channel's local programming, such as Kai Time on the Road, Kete Aronui and Ask Your Auntie; New Zealand movies and documentaries; and the diverse range of international features not seen on other NZ networks.

Programming

Comedy
 Aroha Bridge
 The Ring Inz
 Radio Kuka

Language learning
 Ako
 Tōku Reo
 Kōrero Mai - Television New Zealand's first Māori-language series, presented by Pou Temara
 Ōpaki

News and current affairs

 Te Kāea
 Kawe Kōrero - Reporters
 Paepae
 Media Take
 Te Ao Tapatahi
 Te Ao Mārama

Culture
 Waka Huia

Lifestyle
 Get Your Fish On
 Moko Aotearoa
 Whānau Living
 Kai Time on the Road
 Piri's Tiki Tour

Entertainment
 The GC
 Haka Life
 Game Of Bros
 Playlist
 Tribe
 Whiua Te Pātai

Children
 Pūkana
 Pūkoro
 Mīharo
 Kia Mau!
 Pipi Mā
 Ngā Pāpara Kapi
 Waiata Mai
 Te NūTube
 Pōtae Pai
 Tākaro Tribe
 SpongeBob SquarePants (dubbed in Māori as SpongeBob Tarau Porowhā)
 Dora the Explorer (dubbed in Māori as Dora Mātātoa)
 Team Umizoomi
 Avatar: The Last Airbender

Past programming
 Bakugan Battle Brawlers (dubbed in Māori)
 The Backyardigans (2008–2010)
 This Week in WWE (2018)
 WWE Experience (2018)
 WWE Raw (2018)
 WWE SmackDown (2018)

Mission
The channel aims to revitalise Māori language and culture through its programming. The relevant legislation says "The principal function of the Service is to promote te reo Māori me nga tikanga Māori (Māori language and culture) through the provision of a high quality, cost-effective Māori television service, in both Māori and English, that informs, educates, and entertains a broad viewing audience, and, in doing so, enriches New Zealand's society, culture, and heritage".

Controversies
Canadian John Davy was appointed chief executive of Māori Television in 2002. However, it was found that his qualifications were false — he claimed to hold a degree from "Denver State University" which did not exist — and he was fired. In 2005, newsreader Julian Wilcox was fired (and reinstated) after he contributed to information provided to other media that led to negative coverage of the channel. That same year, Te Kāea presenter Ngarimu Daniels was banned from taking part in protests, and her partner was referred to as a "dyke" by a senior channel manager. She was awarded $16,000 compensation, and her partner, Leonie Pihama, a leading Māori academic and film-maker, resigned from the channel's board, citing a conflict of interest.

In 2015, the channel's star broadcaster, Mihingarangi Forbes, resigned after complaints arose that senior management (including CEO Paora Maxwell) were attempting to shut down a story critical of the Kohanga Reo National Trust Board to be broadcast on her show Native Affairs. An external consultant recommended to the channel's board that reporting "not challenge and critique one another", leading some (including commentator Morgan Godfery) to question whether journalists at Māori Television had the necessary freedom to report on the failures of elders in Māoridom. Native Affairs and other current affairs programming was later cut back or cancelled altogether, a decision criticised by Green MP Marama Davidson.

In 2019, the channel offered candidates for the Auckland mayoralty the opportunity to pay $500 to be interviewed and to have that interview broadcast on its TV and digital platforms, an offer one candidate described as close to "extortion".

Notes

External links

Television stations in New Zealand
Television channels in New Zealand
New Zealand Crown entities
Māori culture
Māori language
Māori organisations
Indigenous television
Television channels and stations established in 2004
English-language television stations in New Zealand
Māori mass media